Swian Zanoni (18 April 1988 – 18 September 2011) was a Brazilian professional motocross racer. He was appointed as one of the major talents of the new generation of the sport in Brazil. He was born in Divino, Minas Gerais, Brazil and died in Orizânia.

Career
Zanoni began riding motorcycles at the age of 8. In his career, the Brazilian was twice runner-up Brazil in the SX2 class, and 20-time champion in motocross and supercross Carioca and a vice Latin American supercross in Costa Rica. With participation in the Motocross World Championship this year, Zanoni was recovering after breaking his forearm during the Grand Prix of Latvia.

Death
Zanoni died during a motocross race in Minas Gerais, Orizânia about 300 km from Belo Horizonte. Zanoni was taken to the hospital in the nearby town of Divino, Minas Gerais, but died from his injuries.

References

1988 births
2011 deaths
People from Minas Gerais
Brazilian motocross riders